Branscomb is an unincorporated community in Mendocino County in the U.S. state California.

The ZIP Code is 95417 and the community is inside area code 707.

History
Benjamin Franklin Branscomb joined an ox-team wagon train that was headed for California in 1857. He was born in Jackson, Ohio, in 1832, the son of Joseph Edmond Branscomb. The family moved to DeKalb County, Missouri, where Joseph became Sheriff. According to family tradition, Joseph, a staunch abolitionist, was shot and killed 3 days before President Lincoln was assassinated, but a contemporary newspaper account says Joseph was shot to death by a Mr. Jacob J. Stoffel in Maysville in July 1865, several months after Lincoln's assassination.

Benjamin later settled in Sonoma County and farmed there for about twenty years. He married one of the daughters of the captain of the wagon train, Mary Jane Taylor, and they had 10 children: 6 boys and 4 girls. They moved to Jackson Valley, Mendocino, in 1880, where he homesteaded  of land and  more under the Timber Act. He was instrumental in starting the first school in that area. He built a large home which, after his family grew up, he turned into a hotel. A small grocery store, meat market and livery stable were added later. After more people came into the area, he established a post office, which first opened in 1894. Since the place had no official name, it was named after him, the postmaster. After his death in 1921, one of his sons, John, inherited the property and ran it until 1959, when he sold it to the Harwood family, who built the timber mill in Branscomb called Harwood Products.
Unfortunately in the year 2007 the mill filed bankruptcy, eventually closing its doors for good in 2008. The Branscomb store along with the post office, officially closed few years after in 2016.

Government

Nearby

Climate
This region experiences warm (but not hot) and dry summers, with no average monthly temperatures above 71.6 °F.  According to the Köppen Climate Classification system, Branscomb has a warm-summer Mediterranean climate, abbreviated "Csb" on climate maps.

References

Unincorporated communities in California
Unincorporated communities in Mendocino County, California